Tolmans Hill is a suburb of Hobart, Tasmania, Australia. It is likely to be the last large scale greenfield suburban development to take place within Hobart city. At the 2011 Australian Census the suburb recorded a population of 568.

The suburb is named after John Gibbs Tolman, a Hobart businessman, who purchased the whole area for just £650 in 1889.

Tolmans Hill was used for grazing up to the 1980s.  In 1991, Hobart City Council approved a subdivision to 415 lots, which acknowledged the need to preserve its bushland character.

There was much controversy when the Tolmans Hill development was first announced as planning permits were not widely made available to the public. The development involved the removal of most of the non-native vegetation, such as Gorse and Cotoneaster whilst trying to retain as much as possible of the endemic vegetation that covered Tolmans Hill. This was a difficult task given during the early years of Hobart Town the hill was deforested on a regular basis.  Then in later years large deliberately lit fires occurred every two to three years. The developers created the Tolmans Hill Local Area Plan as part of its original application to the Hobart City Council. Many restrictions have been placed on land owners regarding re-vegetation, site disturbance, and visual impact.  One condition contained in the stringent Tolmans Hill plan is that in certain parts of the suburb, trees cannot be removed without an amendment to the development permit. This requires an application to the council and a payment for an arborist's report.

As the Hill features prominently upon the skyline of Hobart, a major impact has been seen by many residents of Greater Hobart, however due to the re-vegetation requirements placed on home builders this impact is being reduced over the years.  After the development was allowed to proceed, a movement to protect the Hobart skyline was initiated, as demonstrated in DPIWE (Urban Skylines and Hillfaces Committee), 2000, Planning Guidelines: Urban Skylines and Hillfaces ).  Much of the land that is now bounded by bushland upon the hills of Hobart has very heavy building restrictions in place, as a result of the Tolmans Hill project and the influence of the plan on urban planners. It is claimed that this development has set a new progressive and environmentally sensitive benchmark in Tasmania for other developers.

References

Suburbs of Hobart
Localities of City of Hobart